Hepatoporus is a genus of crabs in the family Xanthidae, containing the following species:

Hepatoporus asper Davie & Turner, 1994
Hepatoporus distinctus (Takeda & Nagai, 1986)
Hepatoporus guinotae (Zarenkov, 1971)
Hepatoporus orientalis (Sakai, 1935)
Hepatoporus pumex Mendoza & Ng, 2008

References

Xanthoidea